This is a list of amusement rides that use (or used) IMAX technology in their operation.  The IMAX format used is listed, along with the ride's location and the date of the ride's opening, where available.

See also
List of amusement rides based on film franchises
List of amusement rides based on television franchises
List of IMAX films
List of IMAX DMR films

References

Rides
IMAX